ABCDEFG and Abcdefg may refer to:

 The English names of the diatonic musical notes, which are "A", "B", "C", "D", "E", "F", and "G"
 ABCDEFG (album), a 2010 album by British band Chumbawamba 
 ABCDEFG Schema, a Geosciences extension to the Access to Biological Collections Data (ABCD) XML schema 
 "ABCDEFG", a 2013 single recorded by American singer Alison Gold
 "Abcdefg", a song by Rosalía from Motomami, 2022

See also
 English Alphabet